The South China University of Technology (SCUT) is a public research university in Guangzhou, Guangdong, China. The university is co-sponsored by the China Ministry of Education and the Guangdong Provincial People's Government. 

The university is a multidisciplinary university focusing on engineering, combined with science, also promoting well coordinated development of management, economics, humanities and law. Its engineering/technology and computer science ranks at 48th among world universities according to the Academic Ranking of World Universities (ARWU) in 2015. As of 2022, the U.S. News & World Report ranks South China University of Technology at 28th in engineering among Best Global Universities. It is a Chinese state Class A Double First Class University identified by the Ministry of Education.

History

 Formerly known as the South China Institute of Technology, it was established in 1952, through a reorganization process that unified the engineering schools and departments of major universities from five provinces in Central and Southern China, including the former National Sun Yat-sen University, Lingnan University, Hunan University, Guangxi University, South China Joint University, and four others.
 In 1960, it was selected as one of the National Key Universities, under the direct administration of the Chinese Ministry of Education.
 The University was renamed as South China University of Technology in 1988.
 In 1995, it was selected as one of the universities into which China will make a significant investment in the 21st century as part of Project 211.
 In 1999, it was rated "excellent" during the Undergraduate Teaching Assessment, and was among the first "Excellent Universities of Undergraduate Education" in the country. In the same year, a national science park was established with the authorization of the State Ministry of Technology and State Ministry of Education. 
 In 2000, authorization was given for the establishment of a Graduate School. 
 In 2001, it became one of the 39 national universities sponsored by Project 985.
 In 2017, it became one of the 36 Class A Double First-Class Universities.

Rankings and reputation
 In the 2013 Leiden Ranking of universities according to the proportion of their scientific publications that rank among the top 10% in their field, SCUT was ranked 138th in the world, 11th in Asia, and 5th in China (excluding Hong Kong) behind Nankai University, Hunan University, University of Science and Technology of China, and Lanzhou University.
 As of 2022, QS World University Rankings placed the university at 407th in the world.
 The university ranked 401-500th according to the 2012 Academic Ranking of World Universities (ARWU). 
 The university ranked 301-400th according to the 2014 Academic Ranking of World Universities (ARWU). In 2015, its engineering/technology and computer science was ranked 48th, and its mathematics and chemistry were ranked 151-200th and 101-150th respectively among world universities.
The university ranked 200-300th according to the 2016 Academic Ranking of World Universities (ARWU).
The university ranked 151-200th according to the 2020 Academic Ranking of World Universities (ARWU).
 The university ranked 448th according to the 2015 U.S. News & World Report Best Global Universities.
 The university ranked 394th according to the 2017 U.S. News & World Report Best Global Universities.
The university ranked 219th according to the 2023 U.S. News & World Report Best Global Universities.

Campuses and Schools

There are three SCUT campuses, both located in Guangzhou: Wushan Campus (or North Campus), University Town Campus (or South Campus, HEMC Campus) and Guangzhou International Campus (GZIC). The headquarters of the university are on the Wushan Campus.

Of SCUT's 32 schools, 17 are located on the Wushan Campus, 11 on the University Town Campus, and 4 on the GZIC.

Wushan Campus (North Campus)

This campus was formerly part of the National Sun Yat-sen University campus, and many buildings remain from that time.

17 schools:
 School of Architecture
 School of Automation Science & Engineering
 School of Business Administration
 School of Chemistry and Chemical Engineering
 School of Civil and Transportation Engineering
 School of Electric Power
 School of Electronic and Information Engineering
 School of Food Science and Engineering
 School of Foreign Languages
 School of Light Industry and Engineering
 School of Materials Science and Engineering
 School of Mathematics
 School of Marxism
 School of Mechanical & Automotive Engineering
 School of Physical Education
 School of Physics and Optoelectronic Technology 
 School of Public Administration

University Town Campus (South Campus)

11 schools:
 School of International Education
 School of Arts
 School of Bioscience and Bioengineering
 School of Computer Science & Engineering
 School of Design
 School of Economics and Commerce
 School of Environment and Energy
 School of Journalism and Communication
 School of Law
 School of Software Engineering
 School of Medicine

Guangzhou International Campus (GZIC) 

4 schools:
 School of Micro-electronics
 School of Molecular Science and Engineering
 Shien-Ming Wu School of Intelligent Engineering
 School of Biomedical Sciences and Engineering

Alumni

Politicians and military
 Cheng SiweiVice Chairman of The National People's Congress
 Wan Qingliang  Former mayor and CCP secretary of Guangzhou City
 Lin Shusen  Former Governor and Deputy Communist Party Chief of Guizhou Province

Athletes
 Chen Ding  2012 Summer Olympics gold medallist in the 20 kilometres walk

Academics
 He Jingtang  Dean of School of Architecture of SCUT, Member of China Academy of Engineering and the main designer of the acclaimed China Pavilion at the 2010 Shanghai World Expo.
 Thomas Hou  Charles Lee Powell Professor of Applied and Computational Mathematics at the California Institute of Technology
 Rong Baisheng, architect and civil engineer

Businesspeople
Yao Zhenhua  Founder of Baoneng Group
Li Dongsheng  CEO of TCL Corporation
Zhang Zhidong  Former CTO of Tencent
He Xiaopeng  Co-founder and president of UCWeb Inc.

References

External links

 Official webpage in English

 
1952 establishments in China
Educational institutions established in 1952
Technical universities and colleges in China
Guangzhou Higher Education Mega Center
Universities and colleges in Guangzhou
Project 985
Project 211